Pervomayevka is a rural locality (a selo) in Zaigrayevsky District, Republic of Buryatia, Russia. The population was 807 as of 2010. There are 6 streets.

Geography 
Pervomayevka is located 30 km north of Zaigrayevo (the district's administrative centre) by road. Khara-Shibir is the nearest rural locality.

References 

Rural localities in Zaigrayevsky District